The 2015 PFF Women's Cup is the 2nd edition of the cup competition. The previous and inaugural edition in 2014 used a 9-a-side format with two halves of 25 minutes. Starting from the 2015 edition, the cup competition were played in full 90 minutes with 11 field players on each team.

Participating teams

Draw
The draw for the 2015 edition was made on August 5, 2015. Matches were played at the Rizal Memorial Stadium in Manila. Matches at the Biñan Football Field in Biñan, Laguna were also planned.

Results

Group stage

Group A

Group B

Knock-out stage

Semifinal

Third place

Final

Awards
Champions:Far Eastern University
Fair Play Award: Far Eastern University
Golden Glove: Kimberly Pariña (FEU)
Best Midfielder: Irish Navaja (DLSU)
Golden Boot: Barbie Sobredo (FEU)
Best Defender/MVP: Alesa Dolino (FEU)

Source:Tiebreaker Times

Notes

References

External links
Group Stage standings and Knock out stage schedule by the Philippine Football Federation

See also
 2014–15 PFF National Men's Club Championship

Women's Cup